Laetmogonidae is a family of sea cucumbers.

Genera
The following genera are recognised in the family Laetmogonidae:
 Apodogaster Walsh, 1891
 Benthogone Koehler, 1895
 Gebrukothuria Rogacheva & Cross, 2009
 Laetmogone Théel, 1879
 †Palaeocaudina Boczarowski, 1997
 Pannychia Théel, 1882
 Psychronaetes Pawson, 1983

References

Echinoderm families
 
Extant Early Cretaceous first appearances